Reference Re Agricultural Products Marketing (also known as the Egg Reference), [1978] 2 S.C.R. 1198 is a landmark constitutional decision of the Supreme Court of Canada on cooperative federalism where the Court unanimously upheld the validity of various Acts passed by the Parliament of Canada and the Legislative Assembly of Ontario for establishing a national agricultural marketing scheme agreed upon by both the federal and provincial governments.

Background

The marketing of agricultural products has had a turbulent history in Canada. In 1949, the Parliament of Canada enacted the Agricultural Products Marketing Act in order to regulate extraprovincial trade. By the 1960s, Ontario and other provinces had settled on a model of marketing boards for specified agricultural products, while the federal government started to set up national schemes as with the Canadian Dairy Commission. Many provinces, but especially Ontario and Quebec, entered into the "Chicken and Egg War" of 1971, where they used their powers to retaliate against each other's products. This resulted in the passage of the Farm Products Marketing Agencies Act by the Parliament of Canada that came into force in December 1972, and the Canadian Egg Marketing Agency was the first scheme to be created on a national scale under it.

In 1976, the Ontario government posed several reference questions to the Court of Appeal for Ontario as to the constitutionality of the entire federal-provincial scheme. In particular, the following Acts were specified:

 the Agricultural Products Marketing Act (Canada), R.S.C. 1970, Chapter A-7, (which allowed the federal government to authorize provincial marketing agencies to regulate interprovincial and export trade),
 the Farm Products Marketing Agencies Act (Canada), 19-20-21, Eliz. II, Chapter 65, (which authorized the federal government to establish national marketing agencies with such powers in specified circumstances), and
 the Farm Products Marketing Act (Ontario), R.S.O. 1970, c. 162, (which authorized the creation of marketing agencies in Ontario, specifying their powers, and authorizing them to cooperate with agencies created by Canada and other provinces).

At the Court of Appeal for Ontario

The Court of Appeal upheld the validity of the scheme, with Dubin J.A. (as he then was) dissenting only with respect to two provisions. The Attorney General of Quebec, together with several groups of egg producers, appealed the result to the Supreme Court of Canada.

At the Supreme Court of Canada

The scheme was generally upheld, with the appeal being allowed only in part. The majority generally adopted the reasons given by Laskin, C.J., subject to reservations.

Impact

The ruling established the following points:

 The federal (apart from two provisions) and Ontario Acts were upheld in total, including numerous regulations thereunder, particularly including quota systems.
 Authority to impose levies, long thought to be strictly a federal matter, was declared to be a matter of dual jurisdiction, depending on where the product upon which the levy is imposed is marketed.

Following the ruling, national marketing agencies were subsequently established with respect to chickens, turkeys and broiler eggs.

The approval that was given to the operation of federal-provincial schemes has also been called the cooperative federalism approach, which has been employed in other areas of shared jurisdiction, and how far that can go was recently discussed in Reference re Securities Act.

See also 
 Canadian Egg Marketing Agency v Richardson
 Manitoba (AG) v Manitoba Egg and Poultry Association

References

Resource
 

Canadian federalism case law
Supreme Court of Canada cases
1978 in Canadian case law
Supreme Court of Canada reference question cases
Eggs (food)